Judge Lawson may refer to:

C. Alan Lawson (born 1961), judge of the Florida Fifth District Court of Appeal, and later justice of the Supreme Court of Florida
David M. Lawson (born 1951), judge of the United States District Court for the Eastern District of Michigan
Hugh Lawson (judge) (born 1941), judge of the United States District Court for the Middle District of Georgia
James Anthony Lawson (1817–1887), judge of the Court of Common Pleas of Ireland
Marjorie McKenzie Lawson (1912–2002), judge of the Juvenile Court of the District of Columbia
Thomas G. Lawson (1835–1912), judge of the Superior Courts of Ocmulgee circuit of Georgia